This is a list of all the reasons that were written by Morris Fish during his tenure as puisne justice of the Supreme Court of Canada up to the end of 2007.

2004

2005

2006

2007

2008

2009

2010

{| width=100%
|-
|
{| width=100% align=center cellpadding=0 cellspacing=0
|-
! bgcolor=#CCCCCC | Statistics
|-
|

2011
{| width=100%
|-
|
{| width=100% align=center cellpadding=0 cellspacing=0
|-
! bgcolor=#CCCCCC | Statistics
|-
|

2012

{| width=100%
|-
|
{| width=100% align=center cellpadding=0 cellspacing=0
|-
! bgcolor=#CCCCCC | Statistics
|-
|

2013

{| width=100%
|-
|
{| width=100% align=center cellpadding=0 cellspacing=0
|-
! bgcolor=#CCCCCC | 2013 statistics
|-
|

Fish